Docking protein 5 is a protein that in humans is encoded by the DOK5 gene.

Function 

The protein encoded by this gene is a member of the DOK family of membrane proteins, which are adapter proteins involved in signal transduction. The encoded protein interacts with phosphorylated receptor tyrosine kinases to mediate neurite outgrowth and activation of the MAP kinase pathway. In contrast to other DOK family proteins, this protein does not interact with RASGAP.

Interactions 

DOK5 has been shown to interact with RET proto-oncogene.

References

Further reading